Carlos Augusto Zopolato Neves (born 7 January 1999), known as Carlos Augusto or simply Carlos, is a Brazilian professional footballer who plays as a left-back for  club Monza. He is also capable of playing as a centre-back, and has been praised for his defensive abilities and his crossing.

Club career

Corinthians
Carlos started his career when he was 12 years old at Corinthians. He was part of the 2017 Copa São Paulo de Futebol Júnior squad that ended up as champion.

Coming through the youth system, Carlos made his professional debut for Corinthians in a friendly against Grêmio on 8 July 2018. He made his official debut as a starter against Athletico Paranaense on 4 August of the same year. Carlos played 32 official games for Corinthians, scoring one goal. He also won the Campeonato Paulista twice: in 2018 and 2019.

Monza
On 28 August 2020, Carlos joined newly-promoted Serie B side Monza on a permanent deal. He scored his first goal on 12 December 2020, in a 2–0 win over Venezia away from home. He became the youngest defender in the 2020–21 Serie B season to score a long-range goal to date. Carlos scored his second goal on 22 December, in a 2–0 win at home against Ascoli. Carlos was nominated in the Serie B Team of the Season, finishing the season with three goals and two assists.

Carlos began the 2021–22 season by scoring against Cittadella in the first round of the 2021–22 Coppa Italia on 14 August 2021; the match ended in a 2–1 defeat. He was key to helping Monza gain their first promotion to Serie A, after winning the promotion play-off final against Pisa.

Carlos made his Serie A debut on 13 August 2022, as a starter in a 2–1 defeat to Torino in the 2022–23 season. He scored his first Serie A goal on 9 October, in a 2–0 home win against Spezia.

International career
On 13 December 2018, Carlos was included in the Brazil U20 squad for the 2019 South American U-20 Championship.

Style of play
Mainly a left-back, Carlos is also capable of playing as a centre-back in both a four-man and three-man defence. His main characteristics are his high elevation and his defensive prowess. Notwithstanding his defensive abilities, Carlos possesses good attacking qualities, mainly his crossing. He has been described as "ideal for Italian football".

Personal life 
Carlos holds an Italian passport through his great-grandparents. He is affectionately nicknamed "" (the Emperor) by Monza fans, in reference to Roman emperor Augustus.

Career statistics

Club

Honours
Corinthians
 Campeonato Paulista: 2018, 2019
 Copa do Brasil runner-up: 2018

Individual
 Serie B Team of the Season: 2020–21

References

External links

 Profile at A.C. Monza 

1999 births
Living people
Sportspeople from Campinas
Brazilian footballers
Citizens of Italy through descent
Association football fullbacks
Sport Club Corinthians Paulista players
A.C. Monza players
Campeonato Brasileiro Série A players
Serie B players
Serie A players
Brazilian expatriate footballers
Brazilian expatriate sportspeople in Italy
Expatriate footballers in Italy